Rasticevo may refer to:
 Rastičevo, Donji Vakuf
 Rastičevo, Kupres